Sandnes Idrettslag is a Norwegian sports club from Sandnes, founded in 1946. The club has sections for track and field athletics, orienteering and skiing.

Athletes competing for Sandnes IL include Henrik Ingebrigtsen, Bjørnar Ustad Kristensen, Filip Ingebrigtsen, Lars Vikan Rise, Per Magne Florvaag, Marius Bakken Støle, and Jakob Ingebrigtsen.

References

External links 
 

Sports clubs established in 1946
Sport in Sandnes
Orienteering clubs in Norway
Athletics clubs in Norway
1946 establishments in Norway